Jamie Clark (born 29 September 1996) is a Scottish professional darts player who competes in Professional Darts Corporation events.

At Q-School in 2022, Clark won his Tour Card on by finishing top of the UK Q-School Order of Merit, to get himself a two-year card on the PDC circuit.

He won a Challenge Tour for the first time in 2021 in Milton Keynes, England.

Performance timeline 

PDC European Tour

References

External links

1996 births
Living people
Professional Darts Corporation current tour card holders
People from Kennoway
Scottish darts players